The Est 0.501 to 0.691, also denoted as Est 0501 to 0691, was a class of 191 French 0-8-0 locomotives for freight service, built from 1856 to 1886 for the Chemins de fer de l'Est.

Construction history

The 25 locomotives of the first batch were originally delivered as 0-8-4 Engerth locomotives by Le Creusot in 1856–1857, with the fleet numbers 0.164 to 0.188.
Due to the inherent inconveniences of the Engerth system, particularly in case of derailments, the decision was taken to rebuild these engines into locomotives with separate tenders, at which point they were also renumbered 0.501 to 0.525. 
Additionally the adhesive weight could be increased from 39.3 to 45.5 tons.
The rebuilding work was carried out in the Est Company's workshops at Épernay from 1860 to 1868.

The subsequent batches were ordered with some differences from various manufacturers from 1866 to 1884.

The locomotives of the first series were named after fictional characters from the works of Rabelais:

The locomotives of the series 0.526 – 0.541 were  given the following names:

References

Bibliography

 

0501
0-8-0 locomotives
Steam locomotives of France
Railway locomotives introduced in 1856
Standard gauge locomotives of France
Schneider locomotives
Fives-Lille locomotives
SACM locomotives
D n2 locomotives

Freight locomotives